The 1971 Five Nations Championship was the forty-second series of the rugby union Five Nations Championship. Including the previous incarnations as the Home Nations and Five Nations, this was the seventy-seventh series of the northern hemisphere rugby union championship. This was the last Five Nations tournament where a try was worth 3 points. Ten matches were played between 16 January and 27 March. It was contested by England, France, Ireland, Scotland and Wales.

Wales won all their four matches to win the championship for the seventeenth time outright, excluding shared titles. They won the Triple Crown for the second time in three seasons and the twelfth time overall, and completed the Grand Slam for the first time since 1952 and the sixth time overall.

Participants
The teams involved were:

Table

Squads

Results

References

External links

The official RBS Six Nations Site

Six Nations Championship seasons
Five Nations
Five Nations 
Five Nations 
Five Nations
Five Nations
Five Nations
 
Five Nations
Five Nations
Five Nations